Ivan Stepanovich Yumashev (– 2 September 1972) was a Soviet Navy admiral, Hero of the Soviet Union (14 September 1945), and Commander-in-Chief of the Soviet Navy from January 1947 to July 1951.

Early years and career
Yumashev was the son of a clerk. In 1910, he was expelled from the fifth grade of school, due to his family being unable to afford school fees. At the age of 15, he began to work as a shoemaker, worker at a cement factory and delivery man in the administration of the Transcaucasian Railways. After the death of his father, he moved with his mother to the village of Kapustin Yar in Astrakhan province, where he began to work as a clerk of a volost government.

In September 1912, he entered the Boatswain and Apprentices School in Kronstadt. Yumashev joined the Baltic Fleet, where he was assigned to the cruiser Bogatyr. He served as a fireman and machinist, before being promoted to a non-commissioned officer. Immediately after the February Revolution of 1917, he was elected chairman of the Sailors' Committee of the Coastal Artillery in Reval. In September 1917, he was dismissed from the Navy due to illness and returned to Krasny Yar. After the October Revolution, he became chairman of the local Committee of the Poor Peasants and chairman of a Selsoviet. In August 1918, he joined the Russian Communist Party, and became the commander of the Red Volunteer detachment.

In February 1919, he voluntarily joined the Red Army Naval Forces and participated in the Russian Civil War on the ships of the 
Astrakhan-Caspian and Volga-Caspian military flotillas. Serving as a gunner, senior gunner and battery commander, he fought on the Volga River and the Caspian Sea, and took part in the defense of Astrakhan.

From August 1920, Yumashev served in the Baltic Fleet. From 1920 to 1921, he was the commander of an artillery unit on the battleship 
Marat, before serving as assistant commander of the ship. During the Kronstadt Uprising in March 1921, he was arrested by the rebels and was in prison until the end of the storming of the fortress by the Red Army.

In 1924 he took part in the first long-distance cruise of the Soviet fleet, which involved the passage of the Vorovskiy messenger ship  from Arkhangelsk to Vladivostok. In 1925, he educated at special courses for commanding officers of the fleet. Yumashev served on the destroyers Lenin and Voikov, which was assigned to the Baltic Fleet. He served as second assistant to the commander of the battleship Marat. in 1932. 

In 1926 he transferred to the Black Sea Fleet as captain of the cruiser Komintern. He subsequently commanded the cruiser Profintern and destroyer flotillas. On 1932, he attended tactical courses for commanders of ships at the Naval Academy. With the introduction of personal military ranks in the USSR, by order of the People's Commissar of Defense of the USSR No. 2488 of November 28, 1935, I. S. Yumashev was awarded the military rank of flagship of the 2nd rank. In September 1937, he became chief of staff of the Black Sea Fleet and in January 1938 commander of the Black Sea Fleet.

World War II
In March 1939, he became commander of the Pacific Fleet and commanded it until 1947. He made a great contribution to the development and strengthening of the fleet, by constructing naval bases, airfields and coastal defense in the Soviet Far East. On June 4, 1940, he was promoted to the rank of Vice Admiral and on May 31, 1943, he was awarded the rank of Admiral.

From August to September 1945, he led the Pacific Fleet war against Japan during Operation August Storm. Under his command, the Pacific Fleet successfully assisted the troops of the 1st and 2nd Far Eastern Fronts in defeating the Kwantung Army, participated in the liberation of South Sakhalin and the Kuril Islands. He also oversaw the Seishin Landing Operation at the northern part of the Korean Peninsula. 

For commanding the fleet in the battles with Japanese troops, on September 14, 1945, he was awarded the title of Hero of the Soviet Union and the Order of Lenin.

Post war
In 1947 he was promoted to Commander in Chief of the Soviet Navy and in 1950 became Minister of the Navy, replaced one year later by Nikolai Gerasimovich Kuznetsov. Since 1951 he was director of the Naval Academy. Yumashev retired in 1957 and died in Leningrad in 1972.

Awards and honours
:
 Hero of the Soviet Union (14 September 1945)
 Order of Lenin, six times (31 May 1943, 21 February 1945, 10 August 1945, 14 September 1945, 8 October 1955, 9 October 1965)
 Order of the Red Banner, three times (22 February 1938, 3 November 1944, 10 June 1949)
 Order of the Red Star (23 December 1935)
 Medal "For the Victory over Germany in the Great Patriotic War 1941–1945" (1945)
 Medal "For the Victory over Japan" (1945)
 Jubilee Medal "Twenty Years of Victory in the Great Patriotic War 1941–1945" (1965)
 Jubilee Medal "In Commemoration of the 100th Anniversary of the Birth of Vladimir Ilyich Lenin" (1969)
 Jubilee Medal "XX Years of the Workers' and Peasants' Red Army" (1938)
 Jubilee Medal "30 Years of the Soviet Army and Navy" (1948)
 Jubilee Medal "40 Years of the Armed Forces of the USSR" (1957)
 Jubilee Medal "50 Years of the Armed Forces of the USSR" (1967)

Other countries:
 Medal of Sino-Soviet Friendship (China)	
 Order of the National Flag, 1st class (North Korea)	
 Medal for the Liberation of Korea (North Korea)
 Grand Cross of the Order of Polonia Restituta (Poland)

Streets in the cities of Vladivostok, Sevastopol and Yekaterinburg are named after Yumashev. Cruiser in the Soviet Navy (Kresta II-class cruiser) and frigate in the Russian Navy (Admiral Gorshkov-class frigate) are also named after Yumashev.

References

Герои Советского Союза: Краткий биографический словарь. Т.2. М.:Воениз.1988.
Здесь России рубеж. Хабаровск, 1981.
Золотые Звёзды тихоокеанцев. — Владивосток, 1982.
Королёв В. Т. Герои великого океана. Владивосток, 1972.
Победа на Дальнем Востоке. Хабаровск, 1985.
Созвездие полководцев. Хабаровск, 1982, кн. 2
Цкитишвили К. В., Чинчилакашвили Т. Г. Герои Советского Союза из Грузии.- Тб.,1981

Soviet admirals
Heroes of the Soviet Union
Recipients of the Order of Lenin
Recipients of the Order of the Red Banner
Recipients of the Order of the Red Star
Grand Crosses of the Order of Polonia Restituta
Recipients of the Order of Polonia Restituta (1944–1989)
1895 births
1972 deaths
Soviet Ministers of Defence
Military personnel from Tbilisi
People from Tiflis Governorate
Burials at Serafimovskoe Cemetery
Soviet military personnel of World War II
Soviet military personnel of the Russian Civil War
N. G. Kuznetsov Naval Academy alumni